A detector is a device capable of registering a specific substance or physical phenomenon.

Detector may also refer to:

 Detector (radio), a device that recovers information from a modulated wave
 Detector (film), a 2000 Norwegian film
 USS Detector, two United States Navy ships
 , was a coastal minesweeper launched 29 May 1941
 , was a minesweeper launched 5 December 1952